Cedric James Robinson (November 5, 1940 – June 5, 2016) was an American professor in the Department of Black Studies and the Department of Political Science at the University of California, Santa Barbara (UCSB). He headed the Department of Black Studies and the Department of Political Science and served as the Director of the Center for Black Studies Research. Robinson's areas of interest included classical and modern political philosophy, radical social theory in the African diaspora, comparative politics, racial capitalism, and the relationships between and among media and politics.

Early life
Robinson was born in Alabama, on November 5, 1940. He then moved to Oakland and grew up there. He attended the University of California, Berkeley, where he earned a B.A. in social anthropology in 1963, and Stanford University, where he received an M.A. and Ph.D. in political theory in 1974.

He became a political activist during his student days, when he protested against the university administration and American foreign and domestic policies along with other Black radical students. He was part of the Afro-American Association at Berkeley, a student group that discussed Black identity, African decolonization, historical and contemporary racism, and related topics.

Robinson's grandfather, Winston "Cap" Whiteside, influenced his radical political views. His grandfather was forced to flee after defending his wife Cecilia, Robinson's future grandmother, from an abusive boss in their hometowns of Mobile, Alabama and decided to go to California during the Great Migration in the 1920s. Robinson named C. L. R. James and Terence Hopkins as other thinkers who shaped his political outlook.

Career and public service
After leaving Berkeley, Robinson was drafted into the U.S. Army and also worked at the Alameda County Probation Department. From 1971 to 1973, Cedric was a lecturer in Political Science and Black Studies at the University of Michigan. In 1973, Cedric accepted his first tenure-track job at Binghamton University–State University of New York. In 1978, Robinson joined the faculty at the University of California, Santa Barbara, and became director of the Center for Black Studies Research.

In 1980, trying to correct what they saw as overall media bias as well as media laziness in accepting what the White House, the US State Department, and The Pentagon said about the Third World and American relations with it, Robinson and UCSB student Corey Dubin started Third World News Review (TWNR) on the campus and community radio station, KCSB. Five years later the program became available on public access television. Since 1980, UCSB students from the Third World and other UCSB faculty members have contributed to the program, produced it, or both.

The author of five books, Robinson also had articles appear in academic journals and anthologies on subjects ranging from political thought in the United States, Africa, and the Caribbean to Western social theory, film, and the press.

Selected bibliography

Books
 Forgeries of Memory & Meaning: Blacks & the Regimes of Race in American Theater & Film Before World War II. Chapel Hill, NC: University of North Carolina Press, 2007.
 An Anthropology of Marxism. 1st ed., London: Ashgate Publishing, 2001. 2nd ed., Chapel Hill, NC: University of North Carolina Press, 2019.
 Black Movements in America. New York: Routledge, 1997.
Black Marxism: The Making of the Black Radical Tradition. 1st ed., London: Zed Books, 1983. 2nd ed., Chapel Hill, NC: University of North Carolina Press, 2000. 3rd ed., Chapel Hill, NC: University of North Carolina Press, 2020.
 Terms of Order: Political Science and the Myth of Leadership. 1st ed., Albany, NY: State University of New York Press, 1980. 2nd ed., Chapel Hill, NC: University of North Carolina Press, 2016.

Journal articles, chapters, reviews, forewords, etc.
 and Elizabeth Robinson. “Foreword” in Futures of Black Radicalism. Edited by Gaye Theresa Johnson and Alex Lubin. New York, NY: Verso Books, 2017
 and Elizabeth Robinson. “The Killing in Ferguson.” Originally published as “Ferguson, Gaza, Iraq. An outline on the official narrative in “post-racial” America” in Commonware: General Intellect Informazione, 2013. http://archivio.commonware.org/index.php/cartografia/452-ferguson-gaza-iraq-outline. 
 “Ventriloquizing Blackness: Eugene O’Neill and Irish-American Racial Performance” Originally published in The Black and Green Atlantic: Cross-Currents of the African and Irish Diasporas. In Cedric J. Robinson. New York, NY: Pluto Press, 2019. Edited by Peter O’Neill, and David Lloyd New York, NY: Palgrave McMillan, 2011.
 “Review of The Soloist in Downtown Blues: A Skid Row Reader.” Los Angeles, CA: Freedom Now Press, 2011.
 “The Black Detective and American Memory.” Originally presented at the American Studies Association Annual Meeting. San Antonio, TX, November 18–21, 2010. In Cedric J. Robinson. New York, NY: Pluto Press, 2019.
 “Review of Black Power in the Belly of the Beast by Judson Jeffries.” The Journal of African American History 92, no. 4, 2007.
 “The Black middle class and the mulatto motion picture.” Race & Class 47, no. 1, July–September 2005.
 “Ralph Bunche and the American Dilemma.” Originally presented at the Ralph Bunche and the American Experience Conference. Boston University, Boston, MA, March 19, 2004. In Cedric J. Robinson. New York, NY: Pluto Press, 2019.
 “The comedy of terror.”  In Cedric J. Robinson. New York, NY: Pluto Press, 2019. Originally Radical History Review 85, Winter 2003.
 and Luz Maria Cabral. “The mulatta on film: from Hollywood to the Mexican revolution.” In Cedric J. Robinson. New York, NY: Pluto Press, 2019. Originally published in Race & Class 45, no. 2, October–December 2003. 
 “Micheaux Lynches the Mammy.” In Cedric J. Robinson. New York, NY: Pluto Press, 2019. Originally presented at Celebrating Black History Month. Skyline College, San Bruno, CA, February 2003. 
 “The inventions of the Negro.” Social Identities 7, no. 3, September 2001
 “On the Los Angeles Times, Crack Cocaine, and the Ramparts Division Scandal.” In Cedric J. Robinson. New York, NY: Pluto Press, 2019. Previously unpublished, 1999.
 “On The Truth and Reconciliation Commission.”  In Cedric J. Robinson. New York, NY: Pluto Press, 2019. Previously unpublished.
 “Blaxploitation and the misrepresentation of liberation.” In Cedric J. Robinson. New York, NY: Pluto Press, 2019. Originally published in Race & Class 40, no. 1, July–September 1998.
 “In the year 1915: D. W. Griffith and the whitening of America.” Social Identities 3, no. 2, 1997.
 “David Walker and the Precepts of Black Studies.” In Cedric J. Robinson. New York, NY: Pluto Press, 2019. Originally presented at the Black Studies Conference, Ohio State University, Columbus, OH, 1997. 
 “Manichaeism and Multiculturalism.” In Mapping Multiculturalism. Edited by Avery Gordon and Christopher Newfield. Minneapolis, MN: University of Minnesota Press, 1996.
 “In search of a pan-African Commonwealth.” Social Identities no. 2, 1996. In Cedric J. Robinson. New York, NY: Pluto Press, 2019.
 “Introduction.” Wright, Richard. White Man, Listen! New York, NY: HarperPerennial, 1995.
 “Slavery and the Platonic Origins of Anti-Democracy” In Cedric J. Robinson. New York, NY: Pluto Press, 2019. Originally published in The Changing Racial Regime. Edited by Matthew Holden. New Brunswick, NJ: Transaction Publishers, 1995. 
 “Ota Benga’s flight through Geronimo’s eyes: tales of science and multiculturalism.” In Cedric J. Robinson. New York, NY: Pluto Press, 2019. Originally published in Multiculturalism. Edited by David Goldberg. Oxford, UK: Blackwell, 1994. 
 “The real world of political correctness.” Race & Class 35, no. 3, January–March 1994.
 “Black Women in American Films.” Elimu 8, no. 1, Fall 1993.
 “The appropriation of Fanon.” In Cedric J. Robinson. New York, NY: Pluto Press, 2019. Originally published in Race & Class 35, no. 1, July–September 1993.
 “Race, Capitalism and the Anti-democracy.” In Cedric J. Robinson. New York, NY: Pluto Press, 2019. Originally published in Reading Rodney King/Reading Urban Uprisings. Edited by Robert Gooding-Williams. New York, NY: Routledge, 1993.
 “C. L. R. James and the world-system.” The C. L. R. James Journal 3, no. 1 Winter 1992.
 “Frantz Fanon” and “Amilcar Cabral” in Routledge Dictionary of Twentieth-Century Political Thinkers. Edited by Robert Benewick and Philip Green. New York, NY: Routledge, 1991.
 “Oliver Cromwell Cox and the historiography of the West.” Cultural Critique 17, Winter 1990–91. In Cedric J. Robinson. New York, NY: Pluto Press, 2019.
 “Fascism and the Response by Black Radical Theorists.” Originally presented at the African Studies Association Annual Meeting. Baltimore, MD, November 1990. In Cedric J. Robinson. New York, NY: Pluto Press, 2019.
 “Du Bois and Black sovereignty: the case of Liberia” Race & Class 32, no. 2, October–December 1990. Also published in Imagining Home: Class, Culture, and Nationalism in the African Diaspora. Edited by Sidney J. Lemelle and Robin D. G. Kelly. New York, NY: Verso Books, 1994. 
 “Mass media and the US presidency.” in Questioning the Media. Edited by John Downing, Ali Mohammadi and Annabelle Sreberny-Mohammadi. Thousand Oaks, CA: Sage Publications, 1994. Originally published in 1990.
 “White Signs in Black Times: The Politics of Representation in Dominant Texts.” Originally presented at the Conference on Black Theorizing Post-Modernism and Post-Structuralism. Center for Black Studies, UC Santa Barbara, May 1989. In Cedric J. Robinson. New York, NY: Pluto Press, 2019.
 “Review of Long Gone by Daryl C. Dance.” Race & Class 29, no. 2, Autumn 1987.
 “Fanon and the West: imperialism in the native imagination.” Africa and the World 1, no. 1, October 1987. In Cedric J. Robinson. New York, NY: Pluto Press, 2019.
 “Capitalism, slavery and bourgeois historiography.” History Workshop 23, Spring 1987.
 “The American press and the repairing of the Philippines.” Race & Class 28, no. 2, 1986. In Cedric J. Robinson. New York, NY: Pluto Press, 2019.
 “The African diaspora and the Italo-Ethiopian crisis.” Race & Class 27, no. 2, 1985.
 “Africa: in hock to history and the banks.” Originally published in Santa Barbara News & Review January 10, 1985. In Cedric J. Robinson. New York, NY: Pluto Press, 2019.
 “Indiana Jones, the Third World and American foreign policy: a review article” Race & Class 26, no. 2, Autumn 1984. In Cedric J. Robinson. New York, NY: Pluto Press, 2019.
 “Fascism and the intersections of capitalism, racialism, and historical consciousness.” Humanities in Society 3, no. 1, Autumn 1983. In Cedric J. Robinson. New York, NY: Pluto Press, 2019.
 “C. L. R. James and the Black radical tradition.” Review 6, no. 3, Winter 1983.
 “Amilcar Cabral and the dialectic of Portuguese colonialism.” In Cedric J. Robinson. New York, NY: Pluto Press, 2019. Reprinted in The Indian Political Science Review 16, no. 2, July 1982. Originally published in Radical America 15, no. 3, May–June 1981.
 “Class antagonisms and Black migration: a review essay.” Race & Class 24, no. 1, Summer 1982.
 “Coming to terms: the Third World and the dialectic of imperialism.” Race & Class 22, no. 4, Spring 1981. 
 “Domination and imitation: Xala and the emergence of the Black bourgeoisie.” Race & Class 22, no. 2, Autumn 1980. 
 “Notes toward a ‘native’ theory of history,” Review 4, no. 1, Summer 1980. In Cedric J. Robinson. New York, NY: Pluto Press, 2019 
 “Review of Race and Politics in South Africa, Ian Robertson and Phillip Whitten, ed.” Contemporary Sociology 9, no. 3, May 1980.
 “Richard Wright: Marxism and the petite-bourgeoisie.” Race & Class 21, no. 4, Spring 1980.
 “The emergence and limitations of European radicalism.” Race & Class 21, no. 2, Autumn 1979.
 “Historical consciousness and the development of revolutionary theory.” Review of Afro-American Issues and Culture 1, no. 3, Fall 1979. Unable to access digitally, journal out of print. Referenced in Myers, Cedric Robinson. 
 “The emergent Marxism of Richard Wright’s ideology.” Race & Class 19, no. 3, Winter 1978.
 “A Critique of Black Reconstruction.” Black Scholar, May 1977.
 “Historical connections: a review of Walter Rodney’s How Europe Under-developed Africa.” Third World Coalition Newsletter, June 1975.
 “‘The First Attack is an Attack on Culture.’” Originally presented in the Afro-Latin Cultural Festival. SUNY Binghamton. April 29, 1975. In Cedric J. Robinson. New York, NY: Pluto Press, 2019.
 “Social conditions among the Black peoples of the Americas.” In World Encyclopedia of Black Peoples. Volume I. Edited by Keith Irvine. St Clair Shores, MI, Scholarly Press, 1975.
 “Malcolm Little as a charismatic leader.” In Cedric J. Robinson. New York, NY: Pluto Press, 2019. Originally published in Afro-American Studies, No. 3, September 1972.

References

External links
 "Celebrating the Black radical tradition", Institute of Race Relations, September 28, 2005.
 Gregory Meyerson, "Rethinking Black Marxism: Reflections on Cedric Robinson and Others", Cultural Logic, Vol. 3, No. 2, Spring 2000.
 Chuck Morse, "Capitalism, Marxism, and the Black Radical Tradition: An Interview with Cedric Robinson", Perspectives on Anarchist Theory, Vol. 3, No. 1, Spring 1999.
 "Cedric Robinson: Short Biography & Selected Works", Perspectives on Anarchist Theory, Vol. 3, No. 1, Spring 1999.
 Cornel West, "The Making of the Black Radical Tradition", Monthly Review, Vol. 40, No. 4, September 1988.

1940 births
2016 deaths
American activists
American Marxists
American television personalities
Male television personalities
African-American Marxists
University of California, Berkeley alumni
Stanford University alumni
American non-fiction writers
University of California, Santa Barbara faculty